Shiva Rajkumar (born Nagaraju Shiva Puttaswamy; 12 July 1962) is an Indian actor, film producer and television presenter, who predominantly works in Kannada cinema. In a career spanning over three decades, he has worked in over 125 films in Kannada and has received several awards, including four Karnataka State Film Awards, four Filmfare Awards South and six South Indian International Movie Awards. 

Shiva is the eldest son of matinee idol Dr. Rajkumar. He made his onscreen debut with Sri Srinivasa Kalyana (1974) as a child artiste. After graduating with a Bachelor of Science in Chemistry, Shiva began his adult film career at the age of 24 by starring in the leading role in his mother's production Anand (1986), which was a critical and commercial success. His performance in Anand which fetched him the Cinema Express Award for Best Actor. He then followed it up with Ratha Sapthami (1986) and Manamecchida Hudugi (1987), both of which were commercially successful, earning him the nickname of Hat-trick Hero, coined by the media and his fans. He then appeared in several successful films in the late 1980s with the romantic-thriller film Samyuktha (1988), the comedy-thriller Inspector Vikram (1988), the action-drama film Ranaranga (1988) and the comedy Aasegobba Meesegobba (1988).

Shiva achieved further critical and commercial success for his films in the 1990s, including his performances in the cult gangster-drama film Om (1995), which catapulted him into superstardom in Karnataka and won him his first Karnataka State Film Award for Best Actor and Filmfare Award for Best Actor and, the romantic dramas Janumada Jodi (1996) and Nammoora Mandara Hoove (1996), the action drama Simhada Mari (1997), the biographical film Bhoomi Thayiya Chochchala Maga (1998) the action-thriller film A. K. 47 (1999) and the romantic drama film Hrudaya Hrudaya (1999), which won him his second Karnataka State Film Award for Best Actor. His acclaimed performances as the film director Manoj in Nammoora Mandara Hoove and the vigilante Raam in A. K. 47 won him his second and third Filmfare Award for Best Actor respectively.  

Anand, Ratha Sapthami (1986), Om (1995), Janumada Jodi, Nammoora Mandara Hoove, A. K. 47, Jogi, Bhajarangi, Mufti, Shivalinga and Tagaru which became milestones in the Kannada film industry and made records at the box office. In 2010, made his television debut with the talk show Naaniruvude Nimagagi, aired on Zee Kannada. He will make his first film appearance outside of Kannada cinema through the Tamil film Jailer (2023). Shivanna produced a TV serial - Manasa Sarovara. He was also the co-producer of two web series - Hate You Romeo (which was shot in Vietnam) and Honeymoon. He is also fondly known as Shivanna by his fans.

Early life and family
Shiva Rajkumar was born in Madras (now Chennai), Tamil Nadu, to actor Rajkumar and film producer Parvathamma as the first of five children. His two brothers are Raghavendra, a film producer and actor Puneeth. Shiva did his schooling in T. Nagar, Chennai and then studied at the New College, Chennai.

On the insistence of film director K. Balachander, Shiva joined an acting school in Chennai after completing his graduation from Madras University in 1983. After training in Kuchipudi dance form under Vempetti Chinni Sathyam in Chennai during his college days, he made his entry into the Kannada film industry with Anand.

Acting career
Shiva started his acting career with the film Anand in 1986  Before that, he had appeared as a child artist in a small role in the 1974 movie Sri Srinivasa Kalyana. In his career spanning over 36 years, he acted in a variety of roles. The most notable movies of his career are Janumada Jodi, Jogi, Anand, Ratha Sapthami, Nammoora Mandara Hoove, Om and Chigurida Kanasu. He acted in Sugreeva, which was shot in 18 hours. His Om, directed by Upendra, set a trend of gangster movies in Kannada and other film industries in India. It continues to be shown even to this day.

In Bhoomi Thayiya Chochchala Maga (1998), Shiva played Karna, a friend of legislator Bharath Kumar (played by Ramesh Aravind), out on a mission to achieve the latter's unfulfilled goal of having a dam constructed in a village. His performance received praise; Srikanth Srinivasa of Deccan Herald called it his "best... till date". Srinivasa also praised Shiva for his performance in Don (2003), where he played a lawyer-turned-serial-killer, and wrote, "Shivanna excels in his role as the don. He has put in a spirited yet collected and controlled performance."

His film Cheluveye Ninne Nodalu was shot at the 7 wonders of the world. His 100th movie, Jogayya, is the sequel to his blockbuster Jogi.

Bhajarangi (2013) was a box-office success, and went on to run for more than 100 days. The film was released in Karnataka, Maharashtra, Andhra Pradesh and Tamil Nadu. It was released in 212 theatres in the state of Karnataka alone.

Personal life
Shiva is married to Geeta, the daughter of the former Chief Minister of Karnataka Sarekoppa Bangarappa. The couple have two daughters: Niveditha and Nirupama.

In media
He was the brand ambassador of Royal Challengers Bangalore for their 11th Season of Indian Premier League. He was the second Kannada actor to buy Maruti 800 when it was launched in 1983 .

Statement about dubbing and remake
Shiva opposed the proposal of voice dubbed movies releasing in the Kannada film industry. He openly criticized the need for voice dubbed movies in the Indian film industry. However, once the Supreme Court gave its final verdict against the ban on dubbed movies, he announced that he would no longer oppose dubbing. He went on to say that if that is what the audience wants, he is not the one to oppose it. In 2003,
he also gave a statement that he would not act in any remake movies. Since then, he has appeared in only 4 remakes out of more than 60 releases in lead roles over a period of 20 years.

Filmography

Awards and honours
Shiva has won four Film fare and four state awards in the best actor category. He has also won numerous Cine-Express, Sirigannada and ETV awards. He has lent his name for creating awareness for social causes and charity. On his birthday, "Shivarajkumar Suvarana Mahotsava Abhinandana Samithi" was formed for charity.

 Recipient of Kohinoor of South India honor by the British South India Council of Commerce and Visionnaire Entertainment - London in 2016 

 Recipient of NTR National Award for 2011

Honorary awards 
 Honorary doctorate from Vijayanagara Sri Krishnadevaraya University of Bellary (2014).
 SIIMA Award for Social Responsibility (2012)
 The residents of Manyata Residency in Bangalore named the circle leading to his house as Dr. Shiva Rajkumar Circle on the occasion of his 60th birthday.
 He received Cinema Express Award for his debut movie Anand (1986 film)

Karnataka State Awards

Filmfare

South Indian International Movie Awards

References

External links
 
 

Living people
Male actors in Kannada cinema
Kannada male actors
Male actors in Telugu cinema
Indian male film actors
20th-century Indian male actors
21st-century Indian male actors
University of Madras alumni
Kannada playback singers
Filmfare Awards South winners
M.G.R. Government Film and Television Training Institute alumni
Male actors from Chennai
South Indian International Movie Awards winners
1962 births
Rajkumar family